The 2018–19 Oregon State Beavers men's basketball team represented Oregon State University in the 2018–19 NCAA Division I men's basketball season. The Beavers, led by fifth-year head coach Wayne Tinkle, played their home games at Gill Coliseum in Corvallis, Oregon as members of the Pac-12 Conference. They finished the season 18–13, 10–8 in Pac-12 play to finish in a three way tie for fourth place. They lost in the quarterfinals of the Pac-12 tournament to Colorado. Despite having 18 wins and a winning conference record they failed to get an invitation to the National Invitation Tournament and also ruled out of the College Basketball Invitational.

Previous season
The 2017–18 Beavers finished the 2017–18 season 16–16, 7–11 in Pac-12 play to finish in tenth place. They defeated Washington in the first round of the Pac-12 tournament before losing in the quarterfinals to USC.

Off-season

Departures

Incoming transfers

2018 recruiting class

2019 Recruiting class

Roster

Schedule and results

|-
!colspan=12 style="background:#; color:#;"| Exhibition

|-
!colspan=12 style="background:#; color:#;"| Non-conference regular season

|-
!colspan=12 style="background:#;"| Pac-12 regular season

|-
!colspan=12 style="background:#;"| Pac-12 tournament

References

Oregon State Beavers men's basketball seasons
Oregon State
Oregon State Beavers men's basketball
Oregon State Beavers men's basketball